Zutulba namaqua is a moth of the family Zygaenidae. It is known from the Democratic Republic of the Congo, Namibia and South Africa.

Subspecies
Zutulba namaqua namaqua (South Africa)
Zutulba namaqua zelleri (Wallengren, 1860) (Democratic Republic of Congo, Namibia, South Africa)

References

Zygaeninae
Insects of the Democratic Republic of the Congo
Moths of Africa
Insects of Namibia
Moths described in 1847